"The Joker's Hard Times" is the 72nd episode of the Batman television series in its second season. Part 2 of a three-part story, it first aired on ABC January 12, 1967 (a full year after the series' debut on The Alphabet Network) and repeated on June 15 the same year. It guest-starred Cesar Romero as The Joker. Its ending cliffhanger was the first for the series that would not be resolved until the following week.

Plot synopsis
With Batman and Robin bound underneath a giant meteorite boulder, soon to drop upon them when released by a burning thermite fuse, Batman frees one of his hands, takes a Batarang from his utility belt, and tosses it at the burning thermite. Breaking off a piece, Batman frees himself, pulls out a Batknife and cuts Robin loose, and they escape with seconds to spare before the great stone drops. Joker, believing the duo are finished, continues his "Zodiac Crime" spree, snatching a statue of Justice (Libra), worth a fortune in Carrara marble, from outside Police HQ, just as Venus, incognito as a trenchcoat detective, plucks a jeweled scorpion (Scorpio). The Dynamic Duo arrive at Police HQ in time to chase down Joker, who disguises himself as a police officer and retreats in a stolen police car. He then leads the police and the Dynamic Duo on a merry chase all over Gotham City by broadcasting bogus instructions on the police citizen's band radio, until Batman foils this plan.

Unable to catch him, the Duo set a trap for Joker and his crew at the home of Basil Bowman (Sagittarius). When Joker arrives and finds Batman and Robin, he grabs Venus and, with a knife at her throat, makes his escape using her as his shield. Finally realizing Joker isn't to be trusted, Venus defects to The Dynamic Duo's side. She leads the duo to the Platter-Porium record shop and there, following a fierce battle with Joker's thugs, they find Leo Crustash. Later, not only does Joker snatch two rare palaremus demnese fish (Pisces) that were on exhibit at the Gotham City Park Fountain, but one of his men kidnaps Venus as well, not long after the Dynamic Duo speed off in a hot pursuit.

En route to their hideout at the warehouse, the Joker's henchmen start shooting at the bullet-proof Batmobile as the Dynamic Duo give chase, forcing them to take a detour. Back at his lair, the Joker catches Batman and Robin in a huge net and quickly takes them to a water-filled tank, where, along with Venus, they are in due course to become the main course for a giant clam. The Joker and his henchmen depart to commit their next crime, while the clam proceeds to swallow Robin.

Cliffhanger text
ARE OUR EYES DECEIVING US?? HAS THE GIANT CLAM REALLY SWALLOWED ROBIN??
WITH BEAUTIFUL VENUS NEXT ON HIS MONSTROUS MENU??
LEAVING THE JOKER FREE TO CONFUSE, CONFOUND AND CONTROL GOTHAM CITY??
FIND OUT NEXT WEEK! SAME TIME! SAME CHANNEL...!

Notes
 The Batmobile's Emergency Bat-Turn Lever is activated for the last time on the series in this episode.

External links
 

Batman (TV series) episodes
1967 American television episodes
Joker (character) in other media
Television episodes written by Stephen Kandel